BirdNote is a nonprofit radio program dedicated to the conservation of birds and their habitats.  BirdNote shows are two-minute vignettes that incorporate the sounds of birds with stories that illustrate their way of life. Shows can be heard on radio, online, and via podcast.

The BirdNote broadcast originated in the Pacific Northwest under the umbrella of the Seattle Audubon Society, a chapter of the National Audubon Society and now operates as a 501(c)(3) nonprofit, Tune In to Nature. The show airs seven days a week on KNKX, an affiliate of  National Public Radio, and also on KTOO-FM, KJJF, KWMR, WNPR/Connecticut Public Radio, WRVO, KPBX, KCAW, KYRS, KPFZ, KHSU, KRTS, KUNM, and nearly 150 other public radio stations across the country, as well as in Canada, and the Philippines. The podcast reaches many more countries. Stories range from natural history to conservation to the language and music of birds.

BirdNote's goal is "to help people connect to the natural world and, for a couple minutes, have respite from the daily grind." Story subjects have included Rachel Carson, Roger Tory Peterson, Aldo Leopold, Frank Chapman, Barry Lopez, Terry Tempest Williams, Ivan Doig, Tony Angell, whooping crane migration, the extinction of the dodo, birds in myth, music, and pop culture, and the natural history of hundreds of species of birds.

Contributors
Most bird sounds for BirdNote are provided by the Macaulay Library of the Cornell Laboratory of Ornithology. Writers include Dennis Paulson, Curator Emeritus of The Slater Museum of Natural History at the University of Puget Sound, the late Robert Sundstrom, birding-by-ear expert with the Seattle Audubon Society, and other writers and naturalists. All shows are reviewed for scientific accuracy by a panel of advisors. Narrators include Mary McCann, Michael Stein, Frank Corrado, a professional actor well known to Seattle theater-goers and many others. John Kessler, of NPR’s Mountain Stage fame, is the producer. All shows have a companion photo, many of which were taken by photographer-naturalist, Paul Bannick. BirdNote's theme music was composed and played by John Kessler and Nancy Rumbel of Tingstad and Rumbel.

References

External links
BirdNote online
The Macaulay Library at the Cornell Laboratory of Ornithology

American public radio programs
2000s American radio programs